Cyperus marginatus is a species of sedge that is native to parts of southern Africa.

See also 
 List of Cyperus species

References 

marginatus
Plants described in 1794
Flora of Kenya
Flora of Botswana
Flora of Angola
Flora of South Africa
Flora of Namibia
Flora of Swaziland
Taxa named by Carl Peter Thunberg